July 1 - Eastern Orthodox Church calendar - July 3

All fixed commemorations below are celebrated on July 15 by Old Calendar.

For July 2nd, Orthodox Churches on the Old Calendar commemorate the Saints listed on June 19.

Saints
 Martyrs Anthimus the Elder, Paul, Bilonus, Theonas, Heron, and another 36 Egyptians, at Thessalonica (c. 305-310)
 Martyr Quintus of Phrygia (c. 285)  (see also: March 2 )
 Saint Juvenal of Jerusalem, Patriarch of Jerusalem (458)
 Saint Basil of Jerusalem, Patriarch of Jerusalem (836 or 838)

Pre-Schism Western saints
 Three Martyrs of Rome, three soldiers who were converted at the martyrdom of the Apostle Paul in Rome, and then were themselves martyred (c. 68)
 Saint Acestes, one of the three soldiers who led St Paul to execution in Rome, he was converted by him, and they were beheaded (1st century)
 Saints Processus and Martinian, martyrs who were greatly venerated in Rome.
 Saints Ariston, Crescentian, Eutychian, Urban, Vitalis, Justus, Felicissimus, Felix, Marcia and Symphorosa, a group of martyrs in the Campagna, under Diocletian (c. 285)
 Saint Monegundis  of Chartres (Monegunde, Monegunda), in Gaul (570)<ref name=
 Saint Oudaceus (Eddogwy), third Bishop of Llandaff in Wales (c. 615)<ref name=
 Saint Swithun, Bishop and Wonderworker of Winchester (862)<ref name=

Post-Schism Orthodox saints
 Saint Photius of Kiev, Metropolitan of Kiev (1431)<ref name=
 Right-believing King Stephen the Great, of Moldavia (1504)<ref name=
 Saint Juvenaly of Alaska, Proto-martyr of America and Alaska (1796)<ref name=
 Saint John (Maximovitch), Archbishop of Shanghai and San Francisco (1966)

New martyrs and confessors
 New Martyr Lampros of Makri, Alexandroupoli, in Thrace (1835)<ref name=

Icons
 Icon of the Most Holy Theotokos "Of Akhtyra" (1739)<ref name=
 Icon of the Most Holy Theotokos "Theodotiev" (1487)<ref name=
 Icon of the Most Holy Theotokos "The Root of Jesse".
 Icon of the Most Holy Theotokos "Pozai" (17th century)<ref name=

Other commemorations
 The placing of the Honorable Robe of the Most Holy Theotokos at Blachernae (5th century)<ref name=
 Feast of the Robe of the Most Holy Theotokos, Georgia.<ref name=
 Uncovering of the relics (2003) of New Hieromartyr Sergius Florinsky, Priest of Rakvere, Estonia (1918)<ref name=  (see also: December 17 )
 Repose of Archimandrite Lawrence of the Iveron-Valdai Monastery (1876)
 Repose of Elder Zachariah, Schema-Archimandrite of St. Sergius Lavra (1936)

Icon gallery

Notes

References

Sources
 July 2/July 15. Orthodox Calendar (PRAVOSLAVIE.RU).
 July 15 / July 2. HOLY TRINITY RUSSIAN ORTHODOX CHURCH (A parish of the Patriarchate of Moscow).
 July 2. OCA - The Lives of the Saints.
 July 2. The Year of Our Salvation - Holy Transfiguration Monastery, Brookline, Massachusetts. 
 The Autonomous Orthodox Metropolia of Western Europe and the Americas (ROCOR). St. Hilarion Calendar of Saints for the year of our Lord 2004. St. Hilarion Press (Austin, TX). p. 49.
 The Second Day of the Month of July. Orthodoxy in China.
 July 2. Latin Saints of the Orthodox Patriarchate of Rome.
 The Roman Martyrology. Transl. by the Archbishop of Baltimore. Last Edition, According to the Copy Printed at Rome in 1914. Revised Edition, with the Imprimatur of His Eminence Cardinal Gibbons. Baltimore: John Murphy Company, 1916. pp. 191–192.
 Rev. Richard Stanton. A Menology of England and Wales, or, Brief Memorials of the Ancient British and English Saints Arranged According to the Calendar, Together with the Martyrs of the 16th and 17th Centuries. London: Burns & Oates, 1892. pp. 297–302.
Greek Sources
 Great Synaxaristes:  2 ΙΟΥΛΙΟΥ. ΜΕΓΑΣ ΣΥΝΑΞΑΡΙΣΤΗΣ.
  Συναξαριστής. 2 Ιουλίου. ECCLESIA.GR. (H ΕΚΚΛΗΣΙΑ ΤΗΣ ΕΛΛΑΔΟΣ). 
  ΙΟΥΛΙΟΣ. Αποστολική Διακονία της Εκκλησίας της Ελλάδος (Apostoliki Diakonia of the Church of Greece).
  02/07/2018. Ορθόδοξος Συναξαριστής. 
Russian Sources
  15 июля (2 июля). Православная Энциклопедия под редакцией Патриарха Московского и всея Руси Кирилла (электронная версия). (Orthodox Encyclopedia - Pravenc.ru).
  2 июля по старому стилю / 15 июля по новому стилю. Русская Православная Церковь - Православный церковный календарь на 2017 год.
  2 июля (ст.ст.) 15 июля 2014 (нов. ст.). Русская Православная Церковь Отдел внешних церковных связей. (DECR).

July in the Eastern Orthodox calendar